Daniel Joseph Moylan (22 November 1915 – 20 February 1992), known as Cooper Moylan, was an Irish hurler who played for Cork Senior Championship club Glen Rovers. He was also a member of the Cork senior hurling team at various times and usually lined out as a forward.

Career

Moylan first came to prominence as a hurler during his schooldays at the North Monastery. He was on "the Mon" Harty Cup-winning teams in 1934 and 1935. At club level Moylan was one of the stalwarts of the Glen Rovers team and won seven consecutive County Senior Championship titles. He also enjoyed championship success with the St. Nicholas' club as a Gaelic footballer. After an unsuccessful one-year tenure with the Cork minor hurling team in 1933, Moylan joined the senior team in 1938. His three seasons with the team saw him win two National League titles and a Munster Championship medal as a reserve. Moylan was also a non-playing reserve when Cork were beaten by Kilkenny in the 1939 All-Ireland final.

Personal life and death

Moylan was born in Dillon's Cross, Cork, the third child of Edward and Agnes Moylan (née King). The son of a waiter, he later worked as a shop assistant. Moylan married Esther Byrne in November 1943 and had four children. 

Moylan died after a period of illness at Marymount Hospice in Cork on 20 February 1992.

Honours

North Monastery
Dr. Harty Cup: 1934, 1935

Glen Rovers
Cork Senior Hurling Championship: 1935, 1936, 1937, 1938, 1939, 1940, 1941

St. Nicholas
Cork Senior Football Championship: 1938, 1941
Cork Intermediate Football Championship: 1937

Cork
Munster Senior Hurling Championship: 1939
National Hurling League: 1938-39, 1939-40

References

1915 births
1992 deaths
Cork inter-county hurlers
Glen Rovers hurlers
St Nicholas' Gaelic footballers